The 2010 Greater Sudbury municipal election was held on October 25, 2010 to elect a mayor and 12 city councillors in Greater Sudbury, Ontario. In addition, school trustees were elected to the Rainbow District School Board, Sudbury Catholic District School Board, Conseil scolaire de district du Grand Nord de l'Ontario and Conseil scolaire de district catholique du Nouvel-Ontario.

The election was held in conjunction with those held in other municipalities in the province of Ontario. For other elections, see 2010 Ontario municipal elections.

Candidate registration opened on January 4, 2010. Six candidates, including three incumbents and three challengers, submitted their nomination papers in the first week. The final registration deadline for candidates was September 10, 2010.

Issues
One of the dominant issues in the election campaign was the status of the city's St. Joseph's Hospital. With the completion of the new Sudbury Regional Hospital facility, the closure of the St. Joseph's site was imminent — however, despite the city's longtime interest in acquiring the property due to its adjacency to Bell Park and Lake Ramsey, the Sisters of St. Joseph sold the site in 2010 to Panoramic Properties, a condominium developer from Niagara Falls. The campaign was subsequently marked by conflicting claims about how much notice the Sisters gave to city council, and how much time and money the city did or didn't have to prepare a counteroffer for the site; a community group, Save Bell Park, formed to lobby for the site's protection.

Less dramatically, most voters identified road maintenance and property taxes as their other key priorities in the election. For the first time since the 2000 election, notably, the municipal amalgamation of the Regional Municipality of Sudbury into the current city of Greater Sudbury, which took place in 2000, did not register as a prominent election issue.

The issue of retail store hours in the city also became an election issue when Marianne Matichuk supported allowing businesses to set their own hours without regulation from the city. If passed, this would include allowing stores in the city to open on Boxing Day for the first time; with labour unions being a prominent political force in the city, the issue of balancing the rights of retailers to set business hours against the rights of workers to holiday time at Christmas has been a persistent debate in Sudbury's municipal politics.

The mayoral candidacy of David Popescu, a perennial candidate in the Sudbury area who was convicted of hate speech after advocating the execution of homosexuals in the 2008 federal election campaign, also emerged as a minor issue when he was permitted to participate in a mayoral debate sponsored by the Greater Sudbury Chamber of Commerce. Marianne Matichuk publicly criticized the Chamber of Commerce for not excluding Popescu from the debate, while candidate Derek Young called Matichuk's move a populist ploy that would both undermine the democratic process and distract from other issues in the debate, and the Chamber of Commerce reiterated that its standing policy when sponsoring political debates was to invite all registered candidates regardless of their personal views.  Popescu had already participated in other mayoral debates during the 2010 election campaign without incident, and none of the candidates for mayor, including Matichuk, opted to boycott the Chamber of Commerce debate over Popescu's inclusion.

On the final Friday of the election campaign, the Sudbury Star endorsed Matichuk for the mayor's chair. The following day, the paper published an article headlined "City misled public about manager's dismissal", alleging that Rodriguez and the incumbent council had deliberately lied to the public about the resignation of Alan Stephen, the former manager of the city's infrastructure and emergency services division, in 2006; however, the incident described in the article was one in which the city appeared to simply have followed its legal obligation to maintain confidentiality around matters involving employee relations. The newspaper subsequently faced criticism for its portrayal of the story and for publishing the story only after it would be too late for Rodriguez or any other member of the city's staff to respond ahead of election day; in an interview on CBC Northern Ontario's Points North following the election, Sudbury Star managing editor Brian MacLeod stated that the paper had received the information in an anonymous brown envelope several days before the story went to print. The Ontario Provincial Police subsequently announced that they were conducting an investigation into the leak.

Polling

Although incumbent mayor John Rodriguez faced significant criticism of his first term as mayor, an Oraclepoll Research survey released on October 13, 2010, twelve days before the election, suggested that he remained in the lead with 41.6 per cent of decided voters; however, this represented a drop of 10.2 per cent from his winning margin in the 2006 election. Matichuk, a political neophyte who was virtually unknown before announcing her campaign in early September, was in second place with 31.5 per cent support, while councillor Ted Callaghan had 22.7 per cent support. All of the other candidates combined had a total of 4.1 per cent support; notably, the poll did not register a single decided voter for either Popescu or Ed Pokonzie.

A subsequent CTV Northern Ontario poll, released in the final week of the campaign, showed significant tightening of the race, with 32 per cent support for Rodriguez, 28 per cent for Matichuk and 18 per cent for Callaghan, with 21 per cent undecided.

Council results
Although Rodriguez and incumbent councillor Ted Callaghan were defeated for the mayoralty, all incumbent councillors who ran for council seats were re-elected. Of the three open seats on city council, only one was won by a political newcomer; the other two were won by former mayors of two of the city's pre-amalgamation suburbs.

Mayor

EastLink manager Marc Serré, the son of former federal Member of Parliament Gaetan Serré, also filed nomination papers, but withdrew from the mayoral race in the final week of nominations.

Ward 1
Incumbent councillor Joe Cimino was one of two councillors who had no opposing candidates file by the close of nominations on September 10.

Ward 2

Ward 3

Ward 4

Ward 5
Incumbent councillor Ron Dupuis was one of two councillors who had no opposing candidates file by the close of nominations on September 10.

Ward 6

Ward 7
Incumbent councillor Russ Thompson did not seek re-election. The winning candidate, Dave Kilgour, is a former mayor of Capreol.

Ward 8
Incumbent councillor Ted Callaghan ran for the mayoralty.

Ward 9

Ward 10
Incumbent councillor Frances Caldarelli was re-elected by just five votes over challenger Fern Cormier, in a race with 175 rejected ballots. Cormier asked for a recount, a position which Caldarelli also endorsed; however, Cormier subsequently withdrew his request after learning that the province's municipal elections law requires recounts to be conducted by the same process as the original count, and does not allow for manual inspection of ballots that were rejected by the voting machines.

Former city councillor Mila Wong also registered as a candidate, but withdrew from the race.

Ward 11
Incumbent councillor Janet Gasparini did not run for re-election. The winning candidate, Terry Kett, is a former mayor of Walden.

Ward 12

Rainbow District School Board results

Wards 1/2

Wards 3/4

Wards 5/6

Wards 7/8

Wards 9/10

Wards 11/12

Sudbury Catholic District School Board results

Wards 1/2

Wards 3/4

Wards 5/6

Wards 7/8

Wards 9/10

Wards 11/12

Conseil scolaire de district du Grand Nord de l'Ontario results

Wards 1/4

Wards 2/3

Wards 5/7

Ward 6

Wards 8/12

Wards 9/10/11

Conseil scolaire de district catholique du Nouvel-Ontario results

Wards 1-4
Two candidates to be elected.

Wards 5-6
Two candidates to be elected.

Wards 7-12
Three candidates to be elected.

References

External links
City of Greater Sudbury Municipal Elections 2010

2010 Ontario municipal elections
2010